Nathaniel Jones (19 April 1832 – 14 December 1905) was a Welsh Calvinistic Methodist minister and poet.

Nathaniel Jones took his bardic name of "Cynhafal" from his birthplace of Llangynhafal, near Ruthin in Denbighshire, where the church is dedicated to Saint Cynhafal. He worked as a tailor, and later as a sales assistant, before becoming a preacher in 1859. He went on to the Calvinistic Methodist College at Bala, becoming a minister at Penrhyndeudraeth in 1865.

Works
Fy Awenydd (1859)
Elias y Thesbiad (1869)
Y Messiah (1895)
Charles o'r Bala (1898)

Sources

1832 births
1905 deaths
Welsh-language poets
Llangynhafal
19th-century poets